Skrzyszów  is a village in Gmina Godów, Wodzisław County, Silesian Voivodeship, southern Poland. It has a population of 3,280 and lies close to the border with the Czech Republic.

External links 
  Official website

Villages in Wodzisław County